Darren Ritchie (born 1977 in South Carolina) is an American actor and singer, originally from Florida.

Career 
Currently Tours internationally with the UK X factor famed group "Tenors Of Rock". Mr. Ritchie is also a principal singer for the California Philharmonic Symphony as well as a singer for the US and international singing group "Broadway Rox". He is perhaps best known for originating the role of the White Knight/Jack On Broadway in Wildhorn's Wonderland: Alice's New Musical Adventure he also originated the role of Jonathan Harker in Frank Wildhorn's Broadway production of Dracula, the Musical in 2004. He has also appeared in featured roles in the Broadway revivals of Little Shop of Horrors, 2003, and Bells are Ringing, 2001, (as Blake Barton). He appeared in the world premiere of Wildhorn's Camille Claudel, at the Goodspeed Opera House, Norma Terris Theatre, in 2003, understudying the role of Paul Claudel.

He appeared in the regional premiere of Ace at the Old Globe Theatre, San Diego, California, in January 2007. He has also appeared in several films and television shows, most notably Stroller Wars.

In 2009, he originated the role of the White Knight/Jack in Wildhorn's Wonderland: Alice's New Musical Adventure for its Tampa, Florida world premiere production. He reprised the role for the show's Broadway run in spring 2011.

In 2017 he released his debut Album "Darren Ritchie and the ADDing Machine" available on iTunes.

References

External links

Living people
Male actors from Florida
American male musical theatre actors
1977 births
Date of birth missing (living people)
Male actors from South Carolina
American male singers